Baga, Togo  is a canton of six villages in the Doufelgou Prefecture in the Kara Region  of north-western Togo.

References

Populated places in Kara Region
Bassar Prefecture